Inacayal (1835-1888) was a cacique (chief) of the Tehuelche people in Patagonia, Argentina who led a resistance against government. They were hunter-gatherers who had a nomadic society, and had long been independent of the Argentine government established in coastal areas. He was one of the last indigenous rulers to resist the Argentine Conquest of the Desert in the late 19th century and its resultant campaigns. He did not surrender until 1884.

His hospitality to Francisco Moreno during the explorer's 1880 expedition to Patagonia was recalled after his surrender, which was covered by the press. Moreno argued with the government on his behalf to spare Inacayal time in military prison. In exchange, Moreno studied him for anthropology. Along with others in his clan, Inacayal was studied for his resemblance to "prehistoric man."

After his death in 1888, anthropologists displayed the indigenous chief's brain and skeleton as an exhibit in the anthropological museum in Buenos Aires. His remains were finally returned to his people in 1994 for reinterment in the Comunidad Tehuelche Mapuche of Chubut Province.

A fossil species of damselfly found in Nahuel Huapi National Park, Argentina was named after him in 2015, Inacayalestes aikunhuapi Petrulevičius 2015.

References

Indigenous leaders of the Americas
Argentine people of indigenous peoples descent
1835 births
1888 deaths